Edoardo Brizio (March 3, 1846, Turin – May 5, 1907, Bologna) was an Italian archaeologist.  He was a student of Giuseppe Fiorelli’s school of archaeology in Pompeii. Brizio became a professor of archaeology at the University of Bologna in 1876, and later director of the Museo Civico of Bologna. He is notable for advancing the theory that the Terramare population had been the original Ligurians.

References 

Italian archaeologists
Academic staff of the University of Bologna
1846 births
1907 deaths
University of Turin alumni